The Reuchenette Formation is a Jurassic geologic formation in Switzerland. It is Kimmeridgian in age and predominantly consists of well stratified limestone, with lithology variable both laterally and stratigraphically including wackestones, packstones and grainstones, as well as mudstone.  Dinosaur remains are among the fossils that have been recovered from the formation, including the Turiasaurian sauropod Amanzia greppini, alongside a theropod tooth belonging to Ceratosauria indet, originally assigned to Megalosaurus meriani. teleosaurid crocodyliformes are also known, including Sericodon, Proexochokefalos and Machimosaurus. The thalassochelydian turtle Solnhofia is known from the formation, as is the platychelyid turtle Platychelys.

See also 
 List of dinosaur-bearing rock formations
 List of stratigraphic units with indeterminate dinosaur fossils

Footnotes

References
 Weishampel, David B.; Dodson, Peter; and Osmólska, Halszka (eds.): The Dinosauria, 2nd, Berkeley: University of California Press. 861 pp. .

Kimmeridgian Stage
Jurassic System of Europe
Geologic formations of Switzerland